Crosswinds is a 1951 adventure film starring Rhonda Fleming and John Payne. It was Payne's sixth film for Pine-Thomas Productions. The film was rereleased in 1962 by Citation Films Inc. as Jungle Attack in a double bill with Untamed West.

Plot
One day in New Guinea, two men, "Jumbo" Johnson and seaplane pilot Nick Brandon, are discussing a possible gold heist. They have a drink with Katherine Shelley, an attractive widow who's obviously drinking away her sorrows.

A magnificent schooner called The Seeker docks in port, captained by Steve Singleton. As he proposes a pearl-diving expedition to Jumbo, he sees Brandon and, without explanation, punches him.

Katherine wants to go along, but Steve sets sail without her as soon as Jumbo arranges the necessary documents in town. Two weeks later, still without a pearl, Steve is boarded by Australian naval authorities who examine his papers and declare them forgeries. Steve is arrested and the boat impounded. While in jail, he learns Jumbo has bought the boat at auction.

Another vessel, The Susan, arrives with two Englishmen on board, Cecil Daubrey and "Mousey" Sykes. In need of a captain because theirs died mysteriously at sea, they watch Steve fix their engine and offer him a job as skipper.

Katherine and Brandon have disappeared. They left on his plane and never returned. Cecil and Mousey believe at least $10 million in gold was aboard Brandon's craft and intend to search for the plane, which is presumed to have crashed. They depart port with Steve at the helm, and ultimately find Brandon's dead body near an island where Katherine has been captured by native headhunters.

Jumbo joins forces with Steve, who explains that Brandon betrayed him during the war. They find the plane, only to be double-crossed by the Englishmen, who drop a net over them. Steve cuts them out with a knife and saves Jumbo's life. Plans backfire for Cecil, who is killed by headhunters' spears, and Mousey, who is thrown to the crocodiles. Steve gets back to port safely, and he and Katherine sail away together.

Cast
 John Payne as Steve Singleton
 Rhonda Fleming as Katherine Shelley
 Forrest Tucker as Jumbo Johnson
 Robert Lowery as Nick Brandon
 Alan Mowbray as Sir Cecil Daubrey
 John Abbott as Algernon "Mousey" Sykes

References

External links

1951 films
1951 adventure films
American adventure films
1950s English-language films
Films directed by Lewis R. Foster
Films set in Indonesia
Paramount Pictures films
Seafaring films
Treasure hunt films
Underwater action films
1950s American films